Tinsley may refer to:

People
Tinsley (surname)
Tinsley Mortimer (born 1976), American socialite
Tinsley Ellis (born 1957), American rock and blues musician

Places

United Kingdom
Tinsley, South Yorkshire, a suburb of Sheffield, England
Tinsley Marshalling Yard, a former railway marshalling yard
Tinsley Motive Power Depot, a former depot
Tinsley railway station, a former station
Tinsley Viaduct, a two-tier road bridge in Sheffield, England; the first of its kind in the UK
Tinsley Green, West Sussex, England
Tinsley House Immigration Removal Centre, an immigration removal centre

United States
Firebase Tinsley, a military fire support base
Tinsley, Mississippi
Tinsley House (museum), part of the Museum of the Rockies in Bozeman, Montana

Court cases
Tinsley v Milligan, a 1993 English trusts law case
Tinsley v. Richmond, a 1961 United States Supreme Court case
Tinsley v. Treat, 205 U.S. 20 (1907)

Other
Dawn Tinsley, a character in the sitcom The Office
Shane Tinsley, a character in the TV series Glee
Beatrice M. Tinsley Prize, awarded by the American Astronomical Society

See also
 
 Tinsel (disambiguation)